Uranolophidae is an extinct family of prehistoric lungfishes which lived during the Late Devonian period. Fossils have been found in North America.

Phylogeny

 Sarcopterygii (Class)
 Dipnoi (Subclass)
 Uranolophina (Order)
 Uranolophidae (Family)
 Uranolophus (Genus)
 Melanognathus (Genus)

References 

Prehistoric lungfish
Prehistoric lobe-finned fish families
Late Devonian fish
Late Devonian animals
Devonian bony fish
Devonian fish of North America
Late Devonian first appearances
Late Devonian extinctions